Inmaculada Martínez-Zarzoso is a Spanish economist and currently a professor and the chair of economic development at the University of Göttingen.

She is also a professor at the Jaume I University. She is and affiliate at the Economic Research Forum.

Career and education 
She obtained a BA from the University of Valencia, a masters in international economics and a PhD University of Birmingham. She has been a professor of economics at the Universidad Jaume I since 1991. She joined the University of Göttingen in 2012. She was an invited professor at the Paris School of Economics in 2019.

Research 
Martinez-Zarzoso mainly works on international economics and environmental economics. Her works have been cited more than 5600 times according to Google Scholar. Her research has been published in Economics Letters, Applied Economics and Ecological Economics. She is the 94th most cited woman in economics according to IDEAS/RePEc.

Her research has been quoted in El Pais, Telos, El Periodico Mediterraneo, VoxEU, and Deutsche Welle.

Selected bibliography 

 Inmaculada Martínez-Zarzosoa and Antonello Maruotti, "The impact of urbanization on CO2 emissions: Evidence from developing countries". Ecological Economics. 70 (7): 1344–1353.
 Martı́nez-Zarzoso, Inmaculada; Bengochea-Morancho, Aurelia (2004-01-01). "Pooled mean group estimation of an environmental Kuznets curve for CO2". Economics Letters. 82 (1): 121–126.
 Martínez-Zarzoso, Inmaculada (2011-01-01). "The log of gravity revisited". Applied Economics. 45 (3): 311–327.

References 

Living people
Spanish economists
Academic staff of the University of Göttingen
Spanish women economists
Alumni of the University of Birmingham
University of Valencia alumni
Year of birth missing (living people)